Victoria is one of Australia's states, and has established several state symbols and emblems.

Official symbols

See also 

 List of symbols of states and territories of Australia
 Australian state colours

References

External links
  Victoria's State Emblems - Victoria Government website Retrieved 02 October 2022.
 The symbols of Victoria - Department of the Prime minister and Cabinet Retrieved 02 October 2022.
 Emblems - Only Melbourne Retrieved 02 October 2022.

Victoria (Australia)